The 1946 Colorado Buffaloes football team was an American football team that represented the University of Colorado as a member of the Mountain States Conference (MSC) during the 1946 college football season. In their fourth season under head coach James J. Yeager, \the Buffaloes compiled a 5–4–1 record (3–2–1 against MSC opponents), tied for fourth place in the MSC, and were outscored by a total of 147 to 91.

End John Zisch and guard Gus Shannon were selected by the International News Service as first-team players on the 1946 All-Mountain States football team. Center Dean was named to the second team.

Schedule

After the season

The 1947 NFL Draft was held on December 16, 1946. The following Buffaloes were selected.

References

Colorado
Colorado Buffaloes football seasons
Colorado Buffaloes football